This is a summary of the electoral history of Helen Clark, Prime Minister of New Zealand (1999–2008), Leader of the Labour Party (1993–2008) and Member of Parliament for Mount Albert (1981–2008).

Local-body elections

1974 election

1977 election

Parliamentary elections

1975 election

1981 election

1984 election

1987 election

1990 election

1993 election

1996 election

1999 election

2002 election

2005 election

2008 election

Leadership elections

1989 deputy-leadership election

1993 leadership election

United Nations elections

United Nations Secretary-General selection, 2016

Notes

References

Clark, Helen
Helen Clark